This article contains information about the literary events and publications of 1974.

Events
February – Novelist Juan Carlos Onetti is one of a group arrested by the Uruguayan dictatorship for selecting as a competition prizewinner and publishing in the newspaper Marcha a short story implicitly critical of the military regime. He subsequently goes into exile in Spain.
February 12 – After publication at the end of 1973 of Aleksandr Solzhenitsyn's The Gulag Archipelago (Архипелаг ГУЛАГ), the author is arrested for treason; the following day he is deported from the Soviet Union. In spring and summer the first translations into French and English begin to appear.
August 8 – The first of Armistead Maupin's Tales of the City is published as a serial in The Pacific Sun (Marin County, California).
October 21 – New Guildhall Library opens in the City of London.
unknown dates
The Jack Kerouac School of Disembodied Poetics is founded by Allen Ginsberg and Anne Waldman.
German writer Uwe Johnson moves to Sheerness on the English Isle of Sheppey.

New books

Fiction
 Eric Ambler – Doctor Frigo
Kingsley Amis – Ending Up
René Barjavel – Les Dames à la licorne
Augusto Roa Bastos – I, the Supreme (Yo el supremo)
Peter Benchley – Jaws
Hal Bennett – Wait Until the Evening
Heinrich Böll – The Lost Honour of Katharina Blum (Die verlorene Ehre der Katharina Blum oder: Wie Gewalt entstehen und wohin sie führen kann)
Anthony Burgess – The Clockwork Testament, or Enderby's End
Andrés Caicedo – "Maternidad"
Agatha Christie – Poirot's Early Cases
Roald Dahl – Switch Bitch
Philip K. Dick – Flow My Tears, The Policeman Said
Annie Dillard – Pilgrim at Tinker Creek
Lawrence Durrell – Monsieur
Frederick Forsyth – The Dogs of War
John Fowles – The Ebony Tower
Donald Goines – Crime Partners
Imil Habibi – The Secret Life of Saeed: The Pessoptimist (الوقائع الغريبة في اختفاء سعيد أبي النحس المتشائل, Al-Waqāʾiʿ al-gharībah fī 'khtifāʾ Saʿīd Abī 'l-Naḥsh al-Mutashāʾil)
John Hawkes – Death Sleep
Joseph Heller – Something Happened
James Herbert – The Rats
 Hammond Innes – North Star
Erica Jong – Fear of Flying
Anna Kavan – Let Me Alone
Stephen King – Carrie
Manuel Mujica Láinez
El laberinto
El viaje de los siete demonios
Derek Lambert 
Blackstone and the Scourge of Europe
The Yermakov Transfer
Margaret Laurence – The Diviners
John le Carré – Tinker, Tailor, Soldier, Spy
Ursula K. Le Guin – The Dispossessed
Madeleine L'Engle – A Wind in the Door
H. P. Lovecraft and August Derleth – The Watchers Out of Time and Others
Robert Ludlum – The Cry of the Halidon
Brian Lumley – Beneath the Moors
Ngaio Marsh – Black as He's Painted
Colleen McCullough – Tim
Nicholas Meyer – The Seven-Per-Cent Solution
James A. Michener – Centennial
Elsa Morante – La Storia (History. A Novel, 1978)
Gerald Murnane – Tamarisk Row
Meja Mwangi – Carcase for Hounds
Vladimir Nabokov – Look at the Harlequins!
Edith Pargeter – Sunrise in the West (first in the Brothers of Gwynedd quartet)
Robert B. Parker – God Save the Child
Ellen Raskin – Figgs & Phantoms
Ishmael Reed – The Last Days of Louisiana Red
Brigitte Reimann (died 1973) – Franziska Linkerhand
Harold Robbins – The Pirate
Fran Ross – Oreo
Leonardo Sciascia – Todo modo
Tom Sharpe – Porterhouse Blue
Sidney Sheldon – The Other Side of Midnight
C. P. Snow – In Their Wisdom

Children and young people
Richard Adams – Shardik
Stan and Jan Berenstain – The Berenstain Bears' New Baby
Robert Cormier – The Chocolate War
Paula Danziger – The Cat Ate My Gymsuit
Fynn (Sydney Hopkins) – Mister God, This Is Anna
Virginia Hamilton – M. C. Higgins, the Great
Diana Wynne Jones – The Ogre Downstairs
Ruth Manning-Sanders – A Book of Sorcerers and Spells
Jill Murphy – The Worst Witch
Bill Peet – Merle the High Flying Squirrel
Miriam Roth – A Tale of Five Balloons (מעשה בחמישה בלונים)
Richard Scarry – The Best Rainy Day Book Ever
Jill Paton Walsh – The Emperor's Winding Sheet
Mary E. Wilkins-Freeman – Collected Ghost Stories

Drama
Nezihe Araz – Bozkır Güzellemesi (An Ode to the Steppe)
Michael Cook – Jacob's Wake
Dario Fo – Can't Pay? Won't Pay! (Non Si Paga! Non Si Paga!)
Paavo Haavikko
Ratsumies (The Horseman)
Kuningas lähtee Ranskaan (The King Goes Forth to France)
Harald Pitkäikäinen
Ira Levin – Veronica's Room
Mustapha Matura – Play Mas
Harold Pinter – No Man's Land
David Rudkin – Penda's Fen (television play)
Tom Stoppard – Travesties

Poetry

Duncan Bush, Tony Curtis, Nigel Jenkins – Three Young Anglo-Welsh Poets

Non-fiction
Maya Angelou – Gather Together in My Name
Carl Bernstein and Bob Woodward – All the President's Men
Vincent Bugliosi with Curt Gentry – Helter Skelter
Robert A. Caro – The Power Broker
David Clark – Social Therapy in Psychiatry
Shelby Foote – The Civil War: A Narrative – Vol 3: Red River to Appomattox
Dumas Malone – Jefferson the President: Second Term, 1805-1809
Robert M. Pirsig – Zen and the Art of Motorcycle Maintenance
Erin Pizzey – Scream Quietly or the Neighbours Will Hear
Jonathan Raban – Soft City
Piers Paul Read – Alive: The Story of the Andes Survivors
Soviet Armenian Encyclopedia (Հայկական Սովետական Հանրագիտարան, Haykakan sovetakan hanragitaran; begins publication)
Lewis Thomas – The Lives of a Cell: Notes of a Biology Watcher
Studs Terkel – Working
Joseph Wambaugh – The Onion Field

Births
January 6 – Romain Sardou, French novelist
January 26 – Shannon Hale, American fantasy author
February 15 – Miranda July (née Grossinger), American filmmaker, performance artist and fiction writer
April 13 – K. Sello Duiker, South African novelist (died 2005)
June 12 – Chika Unigwe, Nigerian novelist writing in English and Dutch
August 7 – Faisal Tehrani, Malaysian novelist
August 9 – Ryūsui Seiryōin (清涼院 流水), Japanese novelist
August 18 – Nicole Krauss, American novelist
August 23 – Serhiy Zhadan, Ukrainian poet, novelist and essayist
September 20 – Owen Sheers, Fijian-born Welsh poet, playwright and novelist
November 4 – Carlos Be, Spanish playwright
December 26 – Joshua John Miller, American novelist and screenwriter
unknown dates
Naomi Alderman, English novelist
Sarah Hall, English novelist
Joanna Kavenna, English novelist and travel writer
Joe Meno, American novelist and journalist
Roger Williams, Welsh dramatist and screenwriter

Deaths
January 20 – Edmund Blunden, English poet and critic (born 1896)
January 25 – James Pope-Hennessy, English biographer (murdered, born 1916)
January 29 
H. E. Bates, English novelist (born 1905)
Sheila Stuart, Scottish author and children's writer (born 1892)
February 2 – Marieluise Fleißer, German dramatist (born 1901)
February 24 – Martin Armstrong, English poet and short story writer (born 1882)
March 3 – Carl Jacob Burckhardt, Swiss historian (born 1891)
March 8 – Buddhadeb Bosu, Bengali poet and writer (born 1908)
March 19 – Austin Clarke, Irish poet, playwright and novelist (born 1896)
March 24 – Olive Higgins Prouty, American novelist (born 1882)
April 14 – Howard Pease, American novelist (born 1894)
May 9 – L. T. C. Rolt, English biographer and writer of ghost stories (born 1910)
May 13 – Arthur J. Burks, American writer (born 1898)
June 2 – Tom Kristensen, Danish novelist and poet (born 1893)
June 11 – Julius Evola, Italian esotericist, journalist and philosopher (born 1898)
June 9 – Miguel Ángel Asturias, Guatemalan Nobel Prize-winning novelist (born 1899)
July 3 – Samuel Roth, American publisher (born 1893)
July 4 – Georgette Heyer, English novelist (born 1902)
July 16 – Oduvaldo Vianna Filho, Brazilian playwright (born 1936)
July 29 - Erich Kästner, German children's author (born 1899)
August 7 – Rosario Castellanos, Mexican writer and diplomat (electric shock, born 1925)
August 11 – Jan Tschichold, German-born typographer and writer (born 1902)
September 11 – Lois Lenski, American author and illustrator (born 1893)
September 21 – Jacqueline Susann, American novelist (born 1918)
October 4 – Anne Sexton, American poet (born 1928)
October 28 – David Jones, Anglo-Welsh poet and artist (born 1895)
October 29 – Victor E. van Vriesland, Dutch writer (born 1892)
November 5 – William Gardner Smith, expatriate American novelist and journalist (born 1927)
November 7 – Eric Linklater, Welsh-born Scottish novelist and travel writer (born 1899)
November 26 – Cyril Connolly, English critic and writer (born 1903)
December 14 – Walter Lippmann, American writer (born 1889)

Awards
Nobel Prize for Literature: Eyvind Johnson and Harry Martinson

Canada
See 1974 Governor General's Awards for a complete list of winners and finalists for those awards.

France
Prix Goncourt: Pascal Lainé, La Dentellière
Prix Médicis French: Porporino ou les Mystèrs de Naples
Prix Médicis International: Julio Cortázar, Libro de Manuel

United Kingdom
Booker Prize: Nadine Gordimer, The Conservationist and Stanley Middleton, Holiday.
Carnegie Medal for children's literature: Mollie Hunter, The Stronghold
Cholmondeley Award: D.J. Enright, Vernon Scannell, Alasdair Maclean
Eric Gregory Award: Duncan Forbes, Roger Garfitt, Robin Hamilton, Frank Ormsby, Penelope Shuttle
Newdigate prize: Alan Hollinghurst
James Tait Black Memorial Prize for fiction: Lawrence Durrell, Monsieur, or the Prince of Darkness
James Tait Black Memorial Prize for biography: John Wain, Samuel Johnson
Queen's Gold Medal for Poetry: Ted Hughes

United States
Frost Medal: John Hall Wheelock
Hugo Award: Arthur C. Clarke, Rendezvous with Rama
Nebula Award: Ursula K. Le Guin, The Dispossessed
Newbery Medal for children's literature: Paula Fox, The Slave Dancer
Pulitzer Prize for Drama: no award given
Pulitzer Prize for Fiction: no award given
Pulitzer Prize for Poetry: Robert Lowell, The Dolphin

Elsewhere
Miles Franklin Award: Ronald McKie, The Mango Tree
Premio Nadal: Luis Gasulla, Culminación de Montoya
Viareggio Prize: Clotilde Marghieri, Amati enigmi

References

 
Years of the 20th century in literature